Greatest Hits is a music video compilation by ZZ Top. It was released in 1992 by Warner Bros. Records.

Track listing
All songs by Billy Gibbons, Dusty Hill, Frank Beard except where noted. 
"Gimme All Your Lovin'"
"Sharp Dressed Man"
"Legs"
"TV Dinners"
"Sleeping Bag"
"Stages"
"Rough Boy"
"Velcro Fly"
"Give It Up"
"My Head's in Mississippi"
"Burger Man"
"Viva Las Vegas" (Doc Pomus, Mort Shuman)

Certifications

References

1992 video albums
ZZ Top video albums
Warner Records video albums
Music video compilation albums